Nick Jr. is a children's television channel dedicated to preschool children. It started its transmission in Portugal on November 2, 2017. The channel is available exclusively on NOS.

Programming

Ben & Holly's Little Kingdom
Blaze and the Monster Machines
Blue's Clues & You!
Bubble Guppies
Dora the Explorer
Kid-e-Cats
Kiva Can Do!
Max & Ruby
Nella the Princess Knight
PAW Patrol
Peppa Pig
Peppa's Australian Adventure
Rusty Rivets
Shimmer and Shine
Sunny Day
Team Umizoomi
Wallykazam!
Zack & Quack

References

External links
 

Television stations in Portugal
Television channels and stations established in 2017
2017 establishments in Portugal
Portuguese-language television stations
Children's television networks
Portugal
Mass media in Lisbon